Route 71 (also known as Hodgewater Line) is a highway in the Canadian province of Newfoundland and Labrador.  It serves as a bypass road to Route 70 and Route 75 (Veterans Memorial Highway).  Upon exiting Route 1, it is a dirt road until just before the access to Route 75.  There is an abundance of summer cottages along the route, and the route terminates at South River in Conception Bay on Route 70.

Route 71 is one of only two known provincial highways whose dirt road portions are accessible in street view on Google Maps and Google Earth (the other being Route 91).

Major intersections

References

071